In the United States, entitlement reform may refer to:
Social Security reform
reforms to other social programs, such as Medicare, Medicaid, and food stamps